Potamitissa is a village in the Limassol District of Cyprus, located 5 km south of Kyperounta.

References

Communities in Limassol District